Marengo is an unincorporated community in Marengo County, Alabama, United States.  A post office operated under the name Marengo from 1824 to 1828 and again from 1914 to 1947.

Gallery
Below are photographs taken in Marengo as part of the Historic American Buildings Survey:

References

Unincorporated communities in Alabama
Unincorporated communities in Marengo County, Alabama